This is an annotated list of notable records from United Kingdom elections to the European Parliament.

Since the first election in 1979, EP elections in Great Britain have used two very different electoral systems.

From 1979 until 1994, elections were conducted using first past the post (FPTP), with Great Britain divided into numerous single member constituencies. Since 1999 however, mainland elections have used the d'Hondt method of proportional representation (PR), with 11 multi-member constituencies corresponding to Scotland, Wales and the regions of England. Northern Ireland has always used the single transferable vote system.

As a result, comparisons between these two types elections are problematic, and the voting system will be noted by each record.

Numerical records

Largest swings

National two-party swings
Swing between the largest party at the previous election and the largest party at the next, or the second-largest party if there was no change.

2019 election (PR) – 27.0% swing from UKIP to Brexit1
1999 election (PR) – 11.5% swing from Labour to Conservative2
2014 election (PR) – 7.5% swing from Conservative to UKIP
1984 election (FPTP) – 6.4% swing from Conservative to Labour
1994 election (FPTP) – 5.3% swing from Conservative to Labour
1989 election (FPTP) – 4.5% swing from Conservative to Labour
2009 election (PR) – 3.8% swing from Labour to Conservative
2004 election (PR) – 1.6% swing from Conservative to Labour

National Labour-Conservative (Butler) swings
1999 election (PR) – 11.5% swing from Labour to Conservative2
2014 election (PR) – 6.8% swing from Conservative to Labour3
1984 election (FPTP) – 6.4% swing from Conservative to Labour
1989 election (FPTP) – 5.3% swing from Conservative to Labour
1989 election (FPTP) – 4.5% swing from Conservative to Labour
2009 election (PR) – 3.8% swing from Labour to Conservative3
2019 election (PR) – 2.2% swing from Conservative to Labour3
2004 election (PR) – 1.6% swing from Conservative to Labour

1 A majority of UKIP MEPs defected to the Brexit Party over the course of the 2014-2019 Parliament, and both UKIP in 2014 and the Brexit Party in 2019 were led by Nigel Farage.
2 The first election held under PR, swing is compared to previous FPTP election
3 At least one major party was not in the top two

Largest fall in percentage share of vote

National 
 2019 election (PR): UKIP, -23.4%
 1999 election (PR): Labour, -16.4%1
 2019 election (PR): Conservatives, -15.1%
 1989 election (FPTP) Liberal Democrats, -12.6%
 1994 election (FPTP) Green Party of England and Wales, -11.5%2
 2019 election (PR): Labour, -10.8%

1 The first election held under PR, fall is compared to previous FPTP election
2 Compared to the UK Green Party in 1989

Largest increase in percentage share of vote

National 
 2019 election (PR): Brexit, +30.5%
 1989 election (FPTP): Green Party, +13.4%
 2019 election (PR): Liberal Democrats, +13.0%
 2014 election (PR): UKIP, +10.6%
 1994 election (FPTP): Liberal Democrats, +10.2%

Largest numbers of seats
Since the introduction of PR, the number of seats has correlated closely with national vote share and parties have never won a majority. Under FPTP, the number of seats won can diverge significantly from national vote share. In the following elections, all FPTP, a single party won a majority:

 1979 election (FPTP): Conservative, 60 of 81 (majority of 20)
 1994 election (FPTP): Labour, 62 of 87 (majority of 18)
 1989 election (FPTP): Labour, 45 of 81 (majority of 4)
 1984 election (FPTP): Conservative, 45 of 81 (majority of 4)

Since 1999, the following elections have seen one party take at least a third of the available seats:
 1999 election (PR): Conservative, 36 of 87
 2019 election (PR): Brexit, 29 of 73
 2004 election (PR): Conservative, 27 of 78
 2009 election (PR): Conservative, 26 of 72
 2014 election (PR): UKIP, 24 of 73

Highest turnout
Turnout has historically been low in UK EP elections compared to other European countries.

National 
 2004 election (PR): 38.5%
 2019 election (PR): 37.0%
 1989 election (FPTP): 36.4%
 1994 election (FPTP): 36.4%

Lowest turnout

National 
 1999 election (PR): 24.0%
 1979 election (FPTP): 32.4%
 1984 election (FPTP): 32.6%

Party records

Largest national vote share under PR
For parties that have returned at least one MEP:

The use of multiple preference votes makes comparisons with Northern Irish Parties difficult.

Smallest national vote share under PR
For parties that have returned at least one MEP:

1: Party failed to return any MEPs

Largest national vote share under FPTP
For parties that have returned at least one MEP:

The Green Party won 14.5% of the vote in 1989, still the best Green performance at any nationwide election, but failed to win any seats due to the FPTP system. Similarly, the SDP–Liberal Alliance took 18.5% of the vote in 1984, again without winning a seat.

See also
 United Kingdom general election records
 United Kingdom by-election records

References
 United Kingdom Election Results
 Previous Election Results, European Parliament Liaison Office in the United Kingdom

Records
European Parliament Election